is a railway station operated by JR West on the San'yō Main Line in Hikari, Yamaguchi, Japan.

Platforms 
The station has one side platform and one island platform.

History 

June 5, 1899: Station opens as part of the Sanyō Railway
December 1, 1906: Station is transferred to Japanese Government Railways as a part of railway nationalization
April 1, 1987: Station operation is taken over by JR West after privatization of Japanese National Railways

See also
 List of railway stations in Japan

External links
  

Railway stations in Japan opened in 1899
Sanyō Main Line
Hiroshima City Network
Railway stations in Yamaguchi Prefecture
Hikari, Yamaguchi